Hoplunnis is a genus of eels in the duckbill eel family Nettastomatidae. It currently contains the following species:

 Hoplunnis diomediana Goode & T. H. Bean, 1896 (Blacktail pike-conger)
 Hoplunnis macrura Ginsburg, 1951 (Freckled pike-conger)
 Hoplunnis megista D. G. Smith & Kanazawa, 1989 
 Hoplunnis pacifica Lane & K. W. Stewart, 1968 (Silver pikeconger)
 Hoplunnis punctata Regan, 1915
 Hoplunnis schmidti Kaup, 1860
 Hoplunnis sicarius (Garman, 1899)
 Hoplunnis similis D. G. Smith, 1989
 Hoplunnis tenuis Ginsburg, 1951 (Spotted pike-conger)

References

 

Nettastomatidae